Botetourt County is a US county that lies in the Roanoke Region of the Commonwealth of Virginia. Located in the mountainous portion of the state, the county is bordered by two major ranges, the Blue Ridge Mountains and the Appalachian Mountains.

Botetourt County was created in 1770 from part of Augusta County and was named for Norborne Berkeley, known as Lord Botetourt. It originally comprised a vast area, which included the southern portion of present-day West Virginia and all of Kentucky. Portions were set off to form new counties beginning in 1772, until the current borders were established in 1851.

Botetourt County is part of the Roanoke Virginia Metropolitan Statistical Area, and the county seat is the town of Fincastle. As of the 2020 census, the county population was 33,596.

History

First proposed in the House of Burgesses in 1767, Botetourt County was created in 1770 from Augusta County. The county is named for Norborne Berkeley, Baron de Botetourt, more commonly known as Lord Botetourt (1718–1770), who was a popular governor of the Virginia Colony from 1768 to 1770, when he died suddenly while in office.

In 1772, the county was reduced to the area east of the New and Kanawha rivers by the creation of Fincastle County. Most of that latter county became the Commonwealth of Kentucky in 1792. The other counties established directly from portions of Botetourt County are: Rockbridge (1778), Bath (1791), Alleghany (1822), Roanoke (1833), and Craig (1851).

Geography
The Blue Ridge Mountains run along the eastern part of the county, while the Appalachian Mountains run along the western portion. The two mountain ranges come close together, separated by the town of Buchanan and the James River.

The James River originates in Botetourt County, near the village of Iron Gate, just south of the Alleghany County line and near the merger of the Cowpasture River and the Jackson River. The James River runs south until Eagle Rock, where it turns east and meanders through the county, passing Springwood and James River High School until entering Buchanan. In Buchanan, the river turns northward and flows into Rockbridge County towards Glasgow.

Botetourt County is a part of the Roanoke Metropolitan Statistical Area, and the southern parts of the county have become increasingly suburban in recent decades. Much of the area's former farmland and orchards have been developed into residential subdivisions and businesses.

Adjacent counties
Roanoke County, Virginia - southwest
Craig County, Virginia - west
Alleghany County, Virginia - northwest
Rockbridge County, Virginia - northeast
Bedford County, Virginia - southeast

National protected areas
 Blue Ridge Parkway (part)
 George Washington National Forest (part)
 Jefferson National Forest (part)

Major highways

Demographics

2020 census

Note: the US Census treats Hispanic/Latino as an ethnic category. This table excludes Latinos from the racial categories and assigns them to a separate category. Hispanics/Latinos can be of any race.

2000 Census
As of the census of 2000, there were 30,496 people, 11,700 households, and 9,114 families residing in the county.  The population density was 56 people per square mile (22/km2).  There were 12,571 housing units at an average density of 23 per square mile (9/km2).  The racial makeup of the county was 94.91% White, 3.52% Black or African American, 0.22% Native American, 0.47% Asian, 0.19% from other races, and 0.69% from two or more races.  0.59% of the population were Hispanic or Latino of any race.

There were 11,700 households, out of which 32.40% had children under the age of 18 living with them, 67.80% were married couples living together, 7.00% had a female householder with no husband present, and 22.10% were non-families. 19.20% of all households were made up of individuals, and 7.60% had someone living alone who was 65 years of age or older.  The average household size was 2.56 and the average family size was 2.92.

In the county, the population was spread out, with 23.40% under the age of 18, 5.80% from 18 to 24, 28.90% from 25 to 44, 28.80% from 45 to 64, and 13.20% who were 65 years of age or older.  The median age was 41 years. For every 100 females there were 99.70 males.  For every 100 females age 18 and over, there were 98.40 males.

The median income for a household in the county was $48,731, and the median income for a family was $55,125. Males had a median income of $37,182 versus $25,537 for females. The per capita income for the county was $22,218.  About 3.60% of families and 5.20% of the population were below the poverty line, including 5.40% of those under age 18 and 6.50% of those age 65 or over.

Government

Board of Supervisors
Amsterdam District: Steve P. Clinton (R)
Blue Ridge District: Billy W. Martin, Sr. (Chairman) (R)
Buchanan District: Amy S. White (R)
Fincastle District: Dr. Richard G. "Dick" Bailey (R)
Valley District: Dr. Donald M. "Mac" Scothorn (Vice Chairman) (R)

Constitutional officers
Clerk of the Circuit Court: Tommy L. Moore (D)
Commissioner of the Revenue: Chris T. Booth (R)
Commonwealth's Attorney: John R. H. Alexander II (R)
Sheriff: Matthew T. Ward (R)
Treasurer: William P. "Bill" Arney (R)

Botetourt County is represented by Republican Stephen D. Newman in the Virginia Senate, Republicans Chris T. Head and Terry L. Austin in the Virginia House of Delegates, and Republican Ben Cline in the U.S. House of Representatives.

Education
Botetourt County Public Schools operates public schools serving the county, with students attending one of two high schools:
 Lord Botetourt High School opened in Daleville in the fall of 1959 and serves the southern parts of the county, including the communities of Blue Ridge, Cloverdale, parts of Fincastle and Troutville, and the northernmost suburbs of Roanoke.
 James River High School in the Springwood area of Buchanan also opened in 1959.  It serves the northern parts of the county including Buchanan, Eagle Rock, Springwood, and parts of Fincastle and Troutville.

Politics
The Republican candidate for president has won the support of Botetourt County in 11 of the last 13 races. The county also voted Republican for governor in 2005, 2009, 2013 and 2017. It voted in 2008 for Mark Warner in the U.S Senate election.

Fire, Emergency medical services, and Law enforcement
Botetourt County Fire & EMS uses a combination of career staff and volunteers to provide fire protection, emergency medical services, fire safety education, swiftwater rescue, and other emergency services to the county. The department operates out of seven stations with a range of fire apparatus and ambulances to provide these services. 

Botetourt County Sheriff's Office is the policing body within Botetourt County. They are stationed in Fincastle, Virginia along with the county jail. The Sheriff is Matthew T. Ward, who was elected in November of 2019. Botetourt County Sheriff's Office works closely with Virginia State Police, as the county only has 69 officers within their force. The county also has their own Emergency Communications Center, which serves to take 9-1-1 calls and help direct law enforcement and first responders to emergency scenes.

Communities

Towns
Buchanan
Fincastle
Troutville

Census-designated places
Blue Ridge
Cloverdale
Daleville
Eagle Rock
Glen Wilton
Hollins
Laymantown

Unincorporated communities

Arcadia
Haden
Lithia
Nace
Oriskany
Springwood

Notable people
 George A. Anderson (1853–1896), United States Congressman from Illinois
 Samuel Barton (1749–1810), Explorer, pioneer, early settler of Nashville and patriot
George Louis Alfonso Pogue (1887-1956), African American doctor who opened an integrated pharmacy in the 1920s in Bedford
 Edward Rumsey (1796–1868), United States Representative from Kentucky
 Angela Tincher, Virginia Tech softball pitcher from 2005 to 2008
 Matthew Ramsey, Songwriter and lead vocalist of the band Old Dominion

See also
National Register of Historic Places listings in Botetourt County, Virginia

References

External links
Botetourt County Official Website
Botetourt County Tourism Website

 
Virginia counties
1770 establishments in Virginia
Counties on the James River (Virginia)
Counties of Appalachia